Somerville School, Greater Noida is a private school in Greater Noida, Uttar Pradesh, India. It is associated with the CBSE board of education.

History
It was established in 1998 by the Lott Carey Baptist Mission. The school building is equipped with a rainwater harvesting system and is earthquake resistant.

Activities and awards

The school is host to Expressions, an inter school carnival held every November; where the best of the schools from around the National Capital Region participate to prove their mettle in the field of English, music, painting, and elocution.

Sister Schools
There are three sister schools located in the National Capital Region i.e. Somerville School (Vasundhara Enclave), Somerville International School (Sector-132 Noida) and Somerville School (Noida).

References

External links
Official website

Baptist schools
Christian schools in Uttar Pradesh
Primary schools in Uttar Pradesh
High schools and secondary schools in Uttar Pradesh
Schools in Noida
Educational institutions established in 1998
1998 establishments in Uttar Pradesh